John Sandwall (26 December 1917 – 17 February 1980) was a Swedish fencer. He competed in the team épée event at the 1956 Summer Olympics.

References

External links
 

1917 births
1980 deaths
Swedish male épée fencers
Olympic fencers of Sweden
Fencers at the 1956 Summer Olympics
20th-century Swedish people